The Gift of the Morning (Italian: Il dono del mattino) is a 1932 Italian comedy film directed by Enrico Guazzoni and starring Germana Paolieri, Carlo Lombardi and Arturo Falconi. It was based on a play by Giovacchino Forzano. It was made by Caesar Film at the company's Rome studios.

Cast
 Germana Paolieri as Lucia Bianchi  
 Carlo Lombardi as Conte Carlo de Flavis  
 Arturo Falconi as Il maestro  
 Olga Capri as La signora Ersilia  
 Vasco Creti as L'ufficiale postale  
 Oreste Bilancia as Annibale  
 Claudio Ermelli as Cavaliere Castelli  
 Carlo Simoneschi as Il pievano  
 Giuseppe Pierozzi as Il vedovo  
 Gina Cinquini as La domestica 
 Cesare Zoppetti 
 Cesarina Gheraldi 
 Carlo Chertier 
 Giovanni Ferrari 
 Umberto Sacripante

References

Bibliography 
 Goble, Alan. The Complete Index to Literary Sources in Film. Walter de Gruyter, 1999.

External links 
 

1932 comedy films
Italian comedy films
1932 films
1930s Italian-language films
Films directed by Enrico Guazzoni
Italian black-and-white films
Italian films based on plays
1930s Italian films